Bullo Cross Halt railway station is a disused railway station opened by the former Bullo Pill Railway, later known as the (Great Western Railway) Forest of Dean Branch.

History

The Halt, which was located 1 mile 37 chains from Newnham on a 1 in 54 gradient.

The Halt consisted of a 153 feet long wooden platform that was at originally at "rail level".

Although the station was served by railmotor services and auto-trains which had folding steps, the platform was raised from 1 foot 2 inches to the standard height of 3 feet. This was authorised on 5 November 1908 at a cost of £423.

The station opened when the passenger services were introduced in August 1907.

A station building was not supplied until 1918, when a spare shelter was moved from (the recently closed) Ruddle Road Halt.

Unfortunately, the wooden platform and pagoda style station building suffered "fire damage beyond repair" in August 1933 and were subsequently replaced.

Services

References

Further reading

Disused railway stations in Gloucestershire
Former Great Western Railway stations
Railway stations in Great Britain opened in 1907
Railway stations in Great Britain closed in 1958